Dhivendran Mogan (born 9 August 1994) is a Malaysian cricketer. In April 2018, he was named in Malaysia's squad for the 2018 ICC World Cricket League Division Four tournament also in Malaysia. He played in Malaysia's opening match of the tournament, against Uganda. In August 2018, he was named in Malaysia's squad for the 2018 Asia Cup Qualifier tournament. In September 2019, he was named in Malaysia's squad for the 2019 Malaysia Cricket World Cup Challenge League A tournament. He made his List A debut for Malaysia, against Canada, in the Cricket World Cup Challenge League A tournament on 19 September 2019.

In February 2020, he was named in Malaysia's Twenty20 International (T20I) squad for the 2020 Interport T20I Series against Hong Kong. He made his T20I debut for Malaysia, against Hong Kong, on 24 February 2020.

References

External links
 

1996 births
Living people
Malaysian cricketers
Malaysia Twenty20 International cricketers
Place of birth missing (living people)
Malaysian people of Tamil descent
Malaysian sportspeople of Indian descent
Southeast Asian Games gold medalists for Malaysia
Southeast Asian Games silver medalists for Malaysia
Southeast Asian Games medalists in cricket
Competitors at the 2017 Southeast Asian Games